Podgorica is a dispersed settlement in the Municipality of Sevnica in east-central Slovenia. It lies on the slope of Mount Lisca north of Sevnica in the historical region of Styria. The municipality is now included in the Lower Sava Statistical Region.

References

External links
Podgorica at Geopedia

Populated places in the Municipality of Sevnica